Zbigniew Paleta (born 1940) is a Polish violinist and composer for telenovelas and the Cinema of Mexico. He is the father of actresses Ludwika and Dominika Paleta. They relocated to Mexico City in 1980.

Awards
Ariel Award in 1998 by the Mexican Academy of Film
Musical score for Libre de culpas.
Best song for Libre de culpas

Albums
  EL tri (Sinfónico, celebrando los 30 años de El tri) , primer violin
 El Tri MTV Unplugged, violin

Telenovelas
 Prisionera de amor (1994)

Films

Mexico
 Knórosov. El desciframiento de la escritura Maya (2000), original music
 Brisa de Navidad (1999), original music
 Al borde (1998), original music
 Libre de culpas (1996), original music
 4 maneras de tapar un hoyo (1995), original music
 La otra familia (2011), original music

Poland
 Trzy kolory: Bialy (1994), director
 Miroslava (1993), violin

External links

1998 Ariel Awards.
Three Colors: Blue soundtrack at Amazon.com
''El Tri Unplugged at MTV

Ariel Award winners
Mexican film score composers
Mexican male composers
Mexican conductors (music)
Male conductors (music)
Mexican violinists
Male violinists
Polish film score composers
Polish conductors (music)
Polish emigrants to Mexico
Polish violinists
Naturalized citizens of Mexico
Living people
1942 births
21st-century conductors (music)
21st-century violinists
21st-century male musicians